J. "Skip" Hall is a former mixed martial artist and IBM sales manager. At 57, "Skip" claimed to be the oldest pro-debuting fighter, and in 2008 at the age of 63 he gained a measure of notoriety as an unusually old combat sports athlete. He was a participant in the Jasper City Slugfest in August 2006 against former UFC Superfight Champion Dan Severn, and retired in 2009 from active MMA fighting after declaring himself "Oldest Active MMA Fighter in history."

Biography

Hall served in the U.S. Army, stationed in Korea as a Clerk Typist. He later became something of a novelty attraction as a mixed martial arts fighter over the age of 60 with limited in-ring success. In 2008, Skip's simultaneous status as an active fighter and senior citizen - as well as since-debunked claims about his special forces background - led to a series of uncritical profiles by various media outlets.

Military service claims

Hall claimed he served in the U.S. Army Special Forces during the Vietnam war, as a "5th SF SOG A Team Leader."- a leadership position in a legendary special operations unit that conducted clandestine missions throughout the conflict.

Attention to Hall's Special Forces claims arose due to a profile written in 2008 by NBC Sports writer Mike Chiappetta. That article led to a FOIA (Freedom of Information Act) request for his official records by Special Forces veterans who were not convinced of Hall's claims. The FOIA report clearly stated Hall did not serve in the U.S. Army Special Forces, nor did he ever deploy to Vietnam as he had claimed for years. His service was as a 71B (Clerk Typist), stationed in Korea.

Mixed martial arts record

|-
|NC
|align=center|3-5-0-1
|Kelly Rundle
|No Contest
|
|
|align=center|1
|align=center|N/A
|Alabama, United States
|Originally a TKO loss, the result was changed to a "no contest" after Hall claimed to have been poked in the eye.
|-
|Loss
|align=center|3-5-0
|Dan Severn
|Submission (choke)
|Jasper City Slugfest
|
|align=center|1
|align=center|N/A
|Alabama, United States
|
|-
|Win
|align=center|3-4-0
|Chuck Costello
|Submission (rear naked choke)
|Worldwide Fighting Championship - Rumble in the Rockies
|
|align=center|1
|align=center|2:14
|Loveland, Colorado, United States
|
|-
|Loss
|align=center|2-4-0
|Anthony Barbier
|TKO (punches)
|Reality Combat Fighting - Duel in the Delta
|
|align=center|1
|align=center|1:25
|Runica, Mississippi, United States
|
|-
|Loss
|align=center|2-3-0
|Graeme Hussey
|Submission (guillotine choke)
|Pride and Glory 2 - Battle of the Ages
|
|align=center|1
|align=center|N/A
|Eldon Square, England
|
|-
|Win
|align=center|2-2-0
|James Wakefield
|Submission (guillotine choke)
|International Cage Brawl
|
|align=center|1
|align=center|N/A
|Birmingham, Alabama, United States
|
|-
|Win
|align=center|1-2-0
|James Wakefield
|
|Independent Event
|
|align=center|1
|align=center|N/A
|Alabama, United States
|
|-
|Loss
|align=center|0-2-0
|Bob Ostovich
|Submission (choke)
|Underground Fight Club 8
|
|align=center|1
|align=center|2:10
|Alabama, United States
|
|-
|Loss
|align=center|0-1-0
|Michael Buchkovich
|TKO (corner stoppage)
|Reality Superfighting 4 - Circle of Truth
|
|align=center|1
|align=center|1:46
|Savannah, Georgia, United States
|

References

External links
 

1944 births
Living people
American male mixed martial artists
Mixed martial artists from Alabama
Light heavyweight mixed martial artists